Kamatamare Sanuki (カマタマーレ讃岐、Kamatamāre Sanuki) is a football club based in Takamatsu, the capital city of Kagawa Prefecture of Japan. They currently play in the J3 League, the Japanese third tier of professional football.

The first part of their name was coined by combining the Japanese word Kamatama (a type of udon noodle bowl) and the Italian Mare ("Sea"). The second part is what Kagawa Prefecture used to be called.

Their name, as well as their crest, that features a kamatama udon bowl, gained a significant interest and recognition, as the club instantly became one of the most-known non-league sides in Japan when their new name and crest was announced in October 2005.

History

The club was founded in 1956 as Takasho OB (Old Boys) Soccer Club (高商OBサッカークラブ) by the former students of Takamatsu Commercial High School's soccer club. Since renaming themselves Kagawa Shiun Football Club (香川紫雲フットボールクラブ) in 1991, they have been the leading football club in Kagawa, winning the Shikoku League Championship twice. The club's name changed again in 2000 to Sun Life (サンライフ) Football Club, when a consumer loan company Sun Life signed a sponsorship deal that continued until the end of the 2004 season.

In October 2005, after briefly being called Takamatsu Football Club, the club officially announced their intention to rise to J. League status and changed their name to Kamatamare Sanuki. In 2010 they won the non-league treble by winning the Shikoku League, the Shakaijin Cup and the Regional League Promotion Series, and by virtue of the latter they were at last promoted to the Japan Football League.

They entered the J. League ahead of the eason 2014, after finishing as runners-up in the Japan Football League in the previous season, having won the J2–J3 promotion/relegation playoff against Gainare Tottori, which Kamatamare leading 2–1 on aggregate score.

In 2018, After five years stint at J2, Kamatamare Sanuki relegation to J3 League from 2019 for the first time in history after worst performance in second tier and finished bottom place. Since their relegation in 2019, the club won't back to second tier.

League record 

Key

Honours
Shikoku Football League (5): 1994, 1997, 2006, 2008, 2010
Shakaijin Cup: 2010
Regional League Promotion Series: 2010

Current squad
As of 19 January 2023.

Coaching Staff
For the 2023 season.

Managerial history

Kit evolution

In pop culture

The Kamatamare players made cameo appearances in the 2006 film "UDON" directed by Katsuyuki Motohiro.

References

External links
(Japanese) Official Site
(Japanese) 2014 Squad

 
Football clubs in Japan
Association football clubs established in 1956
Sports teams in Kagawa Prefecture
1956 establishments in Japan
Japan Football League clubs
J.League clubs